JaMarcus Shephard (born May 30, 1983) is an American football coach who is currently the associate head coach, passing game coordinator and wide receivers coach at the University of Washington.

Playing career
Shephard played wide receiver at DePauw University from 2001 to 2004. He finished his career third all-time in school history for career all-purpose yards and first in career kickoff yardage, a record that still stood as of 2019.

Coaching career
Shephard did not initially pursue a career coaching college football, choosing to work at the NCAA's Education Services Division in order to maintain a steady flow of income. He did coach high school football at his alma mater Northrop High School as a wide receivers coach in 2005, before joining the football staff at Broad Ripple High School in Indianapolis as the team's wide receivers and defensive backs coach. He also did a stint at his other alma mater DePauw as a volunteer assistant on the university's track and field team.

Western Kentucky
After working at the National Center for Drug-Free Sport for four years, Shephard decided to accept a volunteer coaching position on Willie Taggart's staff at Western Kentucky. After Taggart was hired to be the head coach at South Florida, Shephard decided to stay at Western Kentucky under new head coach Bobby Petrino as an offensive quality control assistant working with the wide receivers on shifting the Hilltoppers from a heavy-run offense to a more balanced one. Shephard was promoted to wide receivers coach in 2014, this time on newly hired head coach Jeff Brohm's staff. He was also promoted to special teams coach for the 2015 season.

Washington State
After Hilltoppers offensive coordinator Tyson Helton resigned to accept an assistant coaching position at USC on his brother Clay's staff, Shephard was offered a promotion to offensive coordinator. Shephard declined the promotion and instead accepted a position on Mike Leach's staff at Washington State as the inside wide receivers coach.

Purdue
After Jeff Brohm was hired to be the next head coach at Purdue, Shephard joined his staff as the wide receivers coach and passing game coordinator. He was promoted to co-offensive coordinator in 2018 following the resignation of Tony Levine.

Washington
On January 12, 2022, it was announced that Shepard would join the Washington Huskies as the associate head coach, passing game coordinator, and wide receivers coach.

Personal life
A native of Fort Wayne, Indiana, Shephard attended Northrop High School before attending DePauw University. Shephard and his wife Hallie have two children, Jaylan and Alana.

References

External links
 Washington profile
 Purdue profile
 Washington State profile
 Western Kentucky profile

1983 births
Living people
American football wide receivers
DePauw Tigers football players
Washington Huskies football coaches
Washington State Cougars football coaches
Western Kentucky Hilltoppers football coaches
Purdue Boilermakers football coaches
College track and field coaches in the United States
High school football coaches in Indiana
Western Kentucky University alumni
Coaches of American football from Indiana
Players of American football from Fort Wayne, Indiana
African-American coaches of American football
African-American players of American football
21st-century African-American sportspeople